Britain's Best Bakery is a British daytime cookery show part of the ITV Food category on ITV and narrated by Wendi Peters with judges Mich Turner and Peter Sidwell. The show aired from 26 November 2012 to 14 February 2014.

Gameplay
The TV program is a talent show where the target is try the best independent, family-run or community bakery. Bakeries from all over the UK compete in a series of baking challenges that put their skills to the test and make viewers’ mouths water. It's a tough competition: traditional bakers with top-secret family recipes compete against former patisserie chefs and bread-makers are challenged to create stunning celebration cakes. Two big names from the world of baking judge the competition, not just tasting and analysing the bakes but visiting the bakeries. The competition builds from regional heats to a dramatic finale where the winner of Britains Best Bakery is crowned. Britains Best Bakery shines a light on baking in the UK in all its delicious shapes and sizes. But more than just a competition, it is a celebration of the nations bakeries and their bakers, revealing fascinating stories about Britain and its regions, communities and cultures.

In every episode, bakeries competed in regional heats, with rounds including the "Speciality Bake" and "Baker's Dozen", with the daily winners advancing to cook a "Judge's Choice Cake" in the regional finals on Friday. National finals in the last week featured challenges such as "Chelsea buns for the Chelsea Pensioners", and a great wedding cake from someone British.

Transmissions

Series 1
The first series was won by Hambleton Bakery.

Series 2
The second series was won by brother and sister, David and Lindsay Wright, from The Cake Shop Bakery from Woodbridge in Suffolk.

International versions
The format has been adapted in France, Portugal, Germany, Finland and Italy.

References

External links

The Cookery School at Braxted Park featured in Britain's Best Bakery

2012 British television series debuts
2014 British television series endings
English-language television shows
ITV game shows
Television series by Banijay